Jeff Beal (born June 20, 1963) is an American composer of music for film, television, recordings, and the concert hall. Highly regarded as a jazz instrumentalist and versatile composer, Beal creates music that often incorporates a synthesis of improvisatory and composed elements.

Early life 
Beal was born in Hayward, California, United States and began trumpet studies in the third grade after attending a school music assembly at Castro Valley's Marshall Elementary School with his father. Upon hearing the trumpet played, he chose it as his instrument. Beal's grandmother, Irene Beal, was an accomplished pianist, professional silent-movie accompanist, and fan of trumpeter Miles Davis. She gave Jeff a recording of Miles' collaboration with Gil Evans, Sketches of Spain. Beal wrote his first long-form composition for the Oakland Youth Symphony Orchestra while a student at Castro Valley High School.  OYSO conductor Kent Nagano had Jeff combine his love of jazz improvisation with an orchestral accompaniment. This merging of improvisation with classical composition has remained a hallmark of Beal's music. Beal went on to study composition and trumpet at the Eastman School of Music in Rochester, New York, and graduated in 1985 with a Bachelor of Music degree.

Jazz career
Beal married a fellow Eastman graduate, soprano Joan (Sapiro) Beal, and the pair moved from Rochester to New York City. It was there Beal composed and recorded his debut album, Liberation, for Island Records. Beal's jazz band went on to perform at The Blue Note and the Montreux Jazz Festival. At the request of Chick Corea, Beal composed and recorded a concerto for the virtuosic jazz bassist, John Patitucci, for Corea's Stretch Records label. Beal's signature work, Alternate Route, was composed for improvised trumpet and orchestra. Written fifteen years after his first long form composition, this piece was again premiered by Kent Nagano and the Berkeley Symphony Orchestra, with Beal as trumpet soloist.  He has also composed improvisatory concerti for Dave Samuels, Larry Coombs, and Turtle Island String Quartet.

Film and television composing
In the mid-1990s, Beal relocated to Los Angeles. His first critical notice came in 2001, for his "hypnotic combination of minimalist rhythmic drive and Americana" score to Ed Harris' directorial debut, Pollock. He has since been nominated for nineteen primetime Emmy Awards, and has won five, His first statue was awarded in 2003 for his main theme to the USA Network detective series Monk.  Other Emmy nominations include HBO's evocative Depression era series, Carnivàle and epic drama Rome, as well as four nominations and two wins for Netflix's House of Cards.
Beal is noted for composing most of his music at his home, without assistants or orchestrators, playing most of the instruments himself.  For the music from House of Cards, he added strings through recording a 17-piece string ensemble, which he invited to record in the living room of his home. He recently completed the score for Rodrigo García's Raymond & Ray for which he composed and performed all of the jazz trumpet solos mimed by actor Ethan Hawke.

Concert works
Beal has a catalogue of 35 concert works, published by G. Schirmer Inc./AMP, including many commissioned orchestral, choral and dance compositions.  Beal has conducted his own music with a variety of orchestras, including the Boston Symphony Orchestra in the recording of the score to "Boston", a feature-length documentary on the history of the Boston Marathon the National Symphony Orchestra in House of Cards in Concert at the Kennedy Center, and the Los Angeles Chamber Orchestra performing Beal's new score for Buster Keaton's "The General".. He was commissioned by the St. Louis Symphony Orchestra to compose a new song cycle for Grammy winner Hilá Plittman in honor of Leonard Slatkin’s fifty years with the Orchestra. "The Paperlined Shack", Beal's first album of exclusively his concert music was released in June of 2022 on Supertrain Records featuring the titular song cycle performed by Plittman and the Eastman Philharmonia conducted by Leonard Slatkin and his string quartet "Things Unseen" performed by The New Hollywood String Quartet.

Later life
Beal disclosed that in 2007 he was diagnosed as having multiple sclerosis.  Beal attributes the stabilization of the disease symptoms in part to his busy schedule and the concentration required to compose, as well as treating his MS as a vascular disease with lifestyle intervention and venoplasty treatment.

Selected film credits 

A Gentleman's Game
The Biggest Little Farm
The Price of Everything
Bigger
Shock and Awe
Generation Wealth
An Inconvenient Sequel: Truth to Power
The Sweet Life
Spirit of the Marathon II
Blackfish
The Queen of Versailles
Appaloosa
The Deal
Spirit of the Marathon
Athlete A
He's Way More Famous Than You
Once Fallen
Raymond & Ray
The Company
Where God Left His Shoes
He Was a Quiet Man
The Situation
Emmanuel's Gift 
In the Realms of the Unreal
Pollock
Breaking News in Yuba County
Jay Sebring....Cutting to the Truth
GameStop: Rise of the Players

Selected television credits 

House of Cards
The Long Road Home
The Putin Interviews
GCB
Monk
Ugly Betty
Rome
Nightmares & Dreamscapes
Carnivàle
Back When We Were Grownups
The Dovekeepers
The Wool Cap 
Big Driver
Door to Door 
Medium
In Plain Sight
Challenger: The Final Flight
Jesse Stone television films

Discography

References

External links 

1963 births
American film score composers
American male film score composers
American male classical composers
Living people
People from Hayward, California
People with multiple sclerosis
American male jazz composers
20th-century American composers
20th-century classical composers
21st-century American composers
21st-century classical composers
Classical musicians from California
Jazz musicians from California
American television composers
Male television composers
20th-century American male musicians
21st-century American male musicians
Varèse Sarabande Records artists
20th-century jazz composers
21st-century jazz composers